The 1930 Memorial Cup final was the 12th junior ice hockey championship of the Canadian Amateur Hockey Association. The George Richardson Memorial Trophy champions West Toronto Nationals of the Ontario Hockey Association in Eastern Canada competed against the Abbott Cup champions Regina Pats of the South Saskatchewan Junior Hockey League in Western Canada. In a best-of-three series, held at Shea's Amphitheatre in Winnipeg, Manitoba, Regina won their 2nd Memorial Cup, defeating West Toronto 2 games to none.

Scores
Game 1: Regina 3-1 West Toronto
Game 2: Regina 3-2 West Toronto

Winning roster
Yates Acaster, Frank Boll, Art Dowie, Joe Dutkowski, Ken Campbell, Dave Gilhooley, Lon McPherson, Ken Moore, Gordon Pettinger, Len Rae, Ralph Redding, Eddie Wiseman.  Coach: Al Ritchie

References

External links
 Memorial Cup
 Canadian Hockey League

Mem
Memorial Cup tournaments
Ice hockey in Winnipeg